Prva Futsal Liga is the premier futsal league in Serbia. It is governed by the Football Association of Serbia and it is played under UEFA and FIFA rules. It was founded in 1988 and as of 2019–20 season, the league consists of 10 teams.

2021–22 clubs

As of 2021–22 season, the following clubs participate in the competition:

List of champions

Performance by club
Note: Only clubs from Serbia are listed below.

References

1  5:5 regular result, 11:10 after penalties.

External links
 
 Prva Futsal Liga at srbijasport.net 

Futsal competitions in Serbia
futsal
Serbia
Sports leagues established in 1988
1988 establishments in Serbia
Professional sports leagues in Serbia